Fred Walters is a broadcast executive and journalist who was inducted into the Hall of Fame of the Philadelphia Broadcast Pioneers and in 2013 received the Lifetime Achievement Award of the Pennsylvania Associated Press Broadcasters Association.

Broadcast career 
A native Philadelphian, Walters began his career with The Associated Press there while still an undergraduate at the University of Pennsylvania, after 36 months in the U.S. Navy. 

Walters was the editor on duty when Westinghouse's KYW began its all-news format in 1965. He played a major role in establishing KYW Newsradio as a respected and successful news operation.  When he led the newsroom, it was the only all-news station that was rated Number One in a major American market. He stressed fairness, accuracy, objective analysis, and live reporting.

Besides The Associated Press, he has worked for the American Broadcasting Company, Metromedia Broadcasting, and Westinghouse Broadcasting. Walters has worked in Harrisburg, Philadelphia, New York City, Detroit, and Los Angeles as both reporter and news executive.

He planned, organized and produced coverage of such special events as elections (local, state and national), 1976 United States Bicentennial celebrations in Philadelphia and Valley Forge, the 1976 Eucharistic Congress in Philadelphia (a quadrennial international event of the Roman Catholic Church, held in the United States for the first time in 40 years), inauguration of legalized gambling in Atlantic City in 1978, the 1980 papal visit to New York City, and the 1984 Los Angeles Olympics.

Walters also directed local news coverage of several major breaking news stories over the years, including the 1972 Pennsylvania floods, the bombing of the U. S. Marine barracks in Beirut in 1983, Vietnam protest demonstrations, Watergate hearings, the 1969 Moon Landing, auto industry labor negotiations, the explosion of the Shuttle Challenger in 1986, and many natural disasters such as snowstorms, floods, fires, (including California brush fires), and earthquakes.

Written works 
His columns for the Harrisburg Patriot-News website have been collected into an e-book entitled News Horizons. This is a veteran journalist’s take on the news media, politics, government, and current affairs.

He also wrote a biography of a Revolutionary War hero,  John Haslet: A Useful One, an effort prompted largely by a comment of his history professor at Penn, Dr. Thomas Cochran, who said history is best learned through the lives of the people who made it.  It’s the story of an Irish immigrant who settled in Delaware, involved himself early on in the Patriot cause, then organized and led one of the outstanding regiments in the Continental Army, the Delaware Continentals. He was killed at the Battle of Princeton in January 1777, and the legend is that George Washington wept over his body on the battlefield.  For the title, Walters drew from an essay by historian Whitefield Bell that while people like Thomas Jefferson and Benjamin Franklin "crowd history’s galleries", it was the people who implemented their visions that were "the useful ones."

Awards 
Walters has won awards from the National Headliner Awards, the Society of Professional Journalists, and directed news staffs in Philadelphia and Detroit that were consistently adjudged the best in their state.

Professional memberships 
In addition to his journalism credentials, Walters is a member of the Society of Professional Journalists and as president of the Philadelphia chapter chaired the organization’s national convention in 1976. He also was a member of the Pennsylvania Legislative Correspondents' Association, and served one term as its president. He gained formal recognition of broadcasters in the rules of the Pennsylvania General Assembly.

References

Living people
Year of birth missing (living people)
American television journalists
University of Pennsylvania alumni